The 1893 Iowa Agricultural Cardinals football team represented Iowa Agricultural College (later renamed Iowa State University) as an independent during the 1893 college football season. They were outscored by a combined total of 56 to 4. W. P. Finney was the head coach, and Ed Mellinger was the team captain.

Between 1892 and 1913, the football team played on a field that later became the site of the university's Parks Library.

Schedule

References

Iowa Agricultural
Iowa State Cyclones football seasons
College football winless seasons
Iowa Agricultural Cardinals football